Yaman-Port (Yamanport) is a rural locality (a village) in Krasnoklyuchevsky Selsoviet, Nurimanovsky District, Bashkortostan, Russia. The population was 164 as of 2010. There is 1 street.

Geography 
Yaman-Port is located 32 km north of Krasnaya Gorka (the district's administrative centre) by road. Ustye Yaman-Yelgi is the nearest rural locality.

References 

Rural localities in Nurimanovsky District